Pseudopaludicola mystacalis is a species of frog in the family Leptodactylidae.
It is found in Argentina, Bolivia, Brazil, Paraguay, and possibly Uruguay.
Its natural habitats are moist savanna, subtropical or tropical moist shrubland, subtropical or tropical seasonally wet or flooded lowland grassland, freshwater marshes, intermittent freshwater marshes, pastureland, and seasonally flooded agricultural land.
It is threatened by habitat loss.

References

Pseudopaludicola
Taxonomy articles created by Polbot
Amphibians described in 1887